"Perpetual Dawn" is a song by English electronic music group the Orb from The Orb's Adventures Beyond the Ultraworld. It was originally released in 1991 and re-released in 1994 and features vocals by Jeffrey Nelson and Shola. The song reached  61 on the UK Singles Chart during its original 1991 release and No. 18 during its 1994 reissue.

Track listings
UK release
 "Perpetual Dawn" (Solar Youth Mix) (4:00) 
 "Star 6 & 7 8 9" (Phase II) (4:48) 
 "Perpetual Dawn" (Solar Flare Extended Mix) (6:35)

US release
 "Perpetual Dawn" (Solar Youth Mix) (4:00)   
 "Perpetual Dawn" (Solar Flare Extended) (6:35) 
 "Perpetual Dawn" (Ultrabass I) (8:06) 
 "Perpetual Dawn" (Ultrabass II) (7:10) 
 "Star 6 & 7 8 9" (Phase II) (4:48)

External links
 

The Orb songs
1991 singles
1991 songs
Big Life Records singles